McLene is a surname. Notable people with the surname include:

James McLene (1730–1806), American farmer and politician
Jeremiah McLene (1767–1837), American politician

See also
McLane